Joseph Albert Célestin Rémy Orban (9 April 1880 – 1951) was a Belgian rower who won a silver medal in men's eight at the 1908 Summer Olympics.

References

Belgian male rowers
Olympic rowers of Belgium
Olympic silver medalists for Belgium
Rowers at the 1908 Summer Olympics
Olympic medalists in rowing
1880 births
1951 deaths
Rowers at the 1906 Intercalated Games
Royal Club Nautique de Gand rowers
Medalists at the 1908 Summer Olympics
European Rowing Championships medalists